The 1991 Tercera División play-offs to Segunda División B from Tercera División (Promotion play-offs) were the final playoffs for the promotion from 1990–91 Tercera División to 1991–92 Segunda División B. The champion of every group (excluding reserve teams) took part in the play-off.

The teams play a league of four teams, divided into 17 groups of 5 zones.
Zone A: 4 groups with teams of  Comunidad de Madrid (3ª Gr. 7), Galicia (3ª Gr. 1), Asturias (3ª Gr. 2) & Castilla y León (3ª Gr. 8).
Zone B: 4 groups with teams of Aragón (3ª Gr. 16), País Vasco (3ª Gr. 4), Navarra+La Rioja (3ª Gr. 15) & Cantabria (3ª Gr. 3).
Zone C: 4 groups with teams of  Región de Murcia (3ª Gr. 13), Baleares (3ª Gr. 11), Comunidad Valenciana (3ª Gr. 6) & Cataluña (3ª Gr. 5).
Zone D: 4 groups with teams of  Extremadura (3ª Gr. 14), Castilla-La Mancha (3ª Gr. 17) & Andalucía (3ª Gr. 9 & 10)
Zone E: 1 group with teams of Islas Canarias (3ª Gr. 12).
The champion of each group is promoted to Segunda División B.

Group A1

Results

Group A2

Results

Group A3

Results

Group A4

Results

Group B1

Results

Group B2

Results

Group B3

Results

Group B4

Results

Group C1

Results

Group C2

Results

Group C3

Results

Group C4

Results

Group D1

Results

Group D2

Results

Group D3

Results

Group D4

Results

Group E

Results

Notes

External links
Futbolme

1990-91
2
Play